Matema Island or Matema is of one of the Reef Islands, of the independent nation of the Solomon Islands; it is located in Temotu Province.

The language spoken on Matema Island is Pileni, which is a member of the Polynesian language family. Pileni is also spoken on the islands of Pileni, Nupani, Nifiloli, Aua and Nukapu of the Reef Islands, as well as in the Taumako Islands (also known as the Duff Islands), some 200 miles to the east. Speakers are thought to be descendants of people from Tuvalu.

References

Islands of the Solomon Islands
Polynesian outliers